This is a list of regions of South Korea by Human Development Index as of 2023, with data for the year 2021.

See also 
 List of countries by Human Development Index

References 

Human Development Index
Korea, South
South Korea